Given Kamogelo Mashikinya (born 13 April 1991) is a South African professional soccer player who plays as a midfielder for South African Premier Division side Sekhukhune United.

References

1991 births
Living people
South African soccer players
Soccer players from Pretoria
Association football midfielders
Mpumalanga Black Aces F.C. players
Cape Town City F.C. (2016) players
Bloemfontein Celtic F.C. players
Maritzburg United F.C. players
Sekhukhune United F.C. players
South African Premier Division players